Florsheim Shoes is a shoe brand in the United States.

History
Florsheim & Co. was founded in 1892 by Milton S. Florsheim. He and his father Sigmund Florsheim made the first shoes in Chicago.

Eventually, some stores were owned by and selling only Florsheim. By 1930, Florsheim was making women's shoes and had five Chicago factories and 2500 employees, with 71 stores partly or entirely company-owned and 9000 stores around the US selling Florsheims.

Milton Florsheim died and was succeeded by his son Irving in 1936. His younger son Harold became president in 1946 as the elder brother became chairman.

In 1953, International Shoe Company, the world's largest shoe maker, bought Florsheim for $21 million. Three years later, Florsheim became a division, operating as a separate entity. During its first ten years, Florsheim was International Shoe's most important unit, doubling its sales, and responsible for a quarter of the parent's sales and more than twice that fraction of earnings. Florsheim had 70% of high-quality men's shoes and succeeded when its parent company was struggling.

Florsheim eventually sold women's shoes through Thayer-McNeil stores, also owned by International Shoe (by this time called Interco).

In the 1980s Florsheim began selling athletic shoes, and Interco's shoe division became part of Florsheim.

In 1991, Interco declared bankruptcy but kept Florsheim until the company exited the shoe business in 1994. Florsheim became a separate company. In 1996 it changed its name to Florsheim Shoe Group.

Until the mid-1990s, almost every mall in the US had a Florsheim store. With the rise of such shoe stores as Journeys and Finish Line, Inc., and the de-emphasis of shoe stores in American malls, most Florsheim stores closed by the early 2000s. This followed the fate of other companies such as Kinney Shoes, Thom McAn and Butler Shoes. Butler Shoes became Butler Group owned by Zale Corporation. Butler Group closed in 1990.

In 2002, the company was repurchased by members of the founding family. Thomas W. Florsheim, Jr. and John W. Florsheim of Weyco Group, based in Glendale, Wisconsin, repurchased the brand for $47 million from rival Florsheim Group, according to the Wall Street Journal.

Notable people
Michael Jackson would wear Florsheim Shoes for dancing. He wore the models Como and Como Imperial and had leather heels installed.

Ben Florsheim, the mayor of Middletown, Connecticut, is a direct descendant of Milton S. Florsheim.

See also
 Florsheim Shoe Company Building in Chicago

References

External links
Florsheim corporate site
Weyco Group corporate site
Florsheim Australia site
Florsheim family genealogy

Shoe companies of the United States
American companies established in 1892
Clothing companies established in 1892
1892 establishments in Illinois
Glendale, Wisconsin
Companies based in Wisconsin